Love Will Find a Way is an album by saxophonist Pharoah Sanders. It was recorded in Burbank, California, in 1977, and was released in 1978 by Arista Records. On the album, which was produced by Norman Connors, Sanders is joined by a large ensemble of musicians.

Love Will Find a Way, which features vocalist Phyllis Hyman, was Sanders' first release on Arista, and represented a turn toward more commercial music. According to writer Tom Terrell, the album "became a quiet storm classic, sold pretty well, revived Hyman's career and positioned Pharoah as heir-apparent to Grover Washington Jr.'s throne." In an interview, however, Sanders stated that he resisted being pigeonholed, commenting "No, I ain't gonna be that way, it's either me or else."

The song "Love Will Find a Way" appears as the closing track on Philip Bailey's 2019 album of the same name.

Reception

A writer for Billboard called the album "a soothing, mood setting collection of instrumentally oriented cuts."

Track listing

 "Love Will Find a Way" (Bedria Sanders) – 5:12
 "Pharomba" (Pharoah Sanders) – 4:32
 "Love Is Here" (Pharoah Sanders) – 4:43
 "Got to Give It Up" (Marvin Gaye) – 6:29
 "As You Are" (Norman Connors, Paul Smith) – 5:08
 "Answer Me My Love" (Carl Sigman, Fred Rauch, Gerhard Winkler) – 6:42
 "Everything I Have Is Good" (Pharoah Sanders) – 6:00

Personnel 
 Pharoah Sanders – tenor saxophone, soprano saxophone, percussion
 Terry Harrington – saxophone
 William Green – saxophone
 Ernie Watts – reeds
 Charles Findley – trumpet
 Oscar Brashear – trumpet
 George Bohanon – trombone
 Lew McCreary – trombone
 Sidney Muldrow – French horn
 Vincent DeRosa – French horn
 Hubert Eaves III – keyboards
 Khalid Moss – keyboards
 Bobby Lyle – keyboards
 David T. Walker – electric guitar
 Wah Wah Watson – electric guitar
 Alex Blake – bass (tracks 1 and 3)
 Donny Beck – bass (tracks 1, 4, 5, and 7)
 Eddie Watson – bass (track 6)
 Phyllis Hyman – vocals (tracks 3, 5, and 7)
 Norman Connors – timpani, drums, percussion, gong, vocals
 Kenneth Nash – congas, bongos, cymbal, gong, percussion
 James Gadson – drums (tracks 1, 4, and 7)
 Lenny White – drums (tracks 2 and 3)
 Raymond Pounds – drums (tracks 5 and 6)
 The Water Family – backing vocals

References

1978 albums
Pharoah Sanders albums
Arista Records albums